= Houston Arcade Expo =

Yearly event in Houston

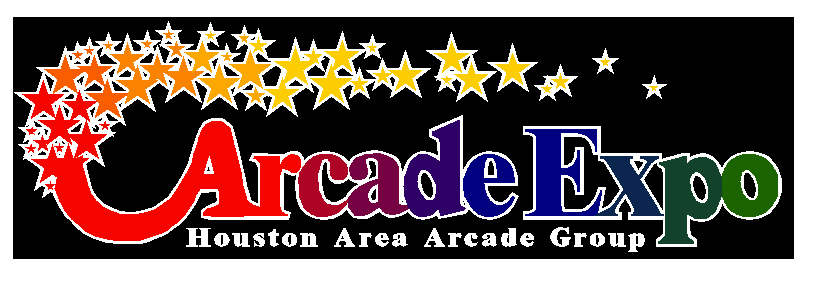

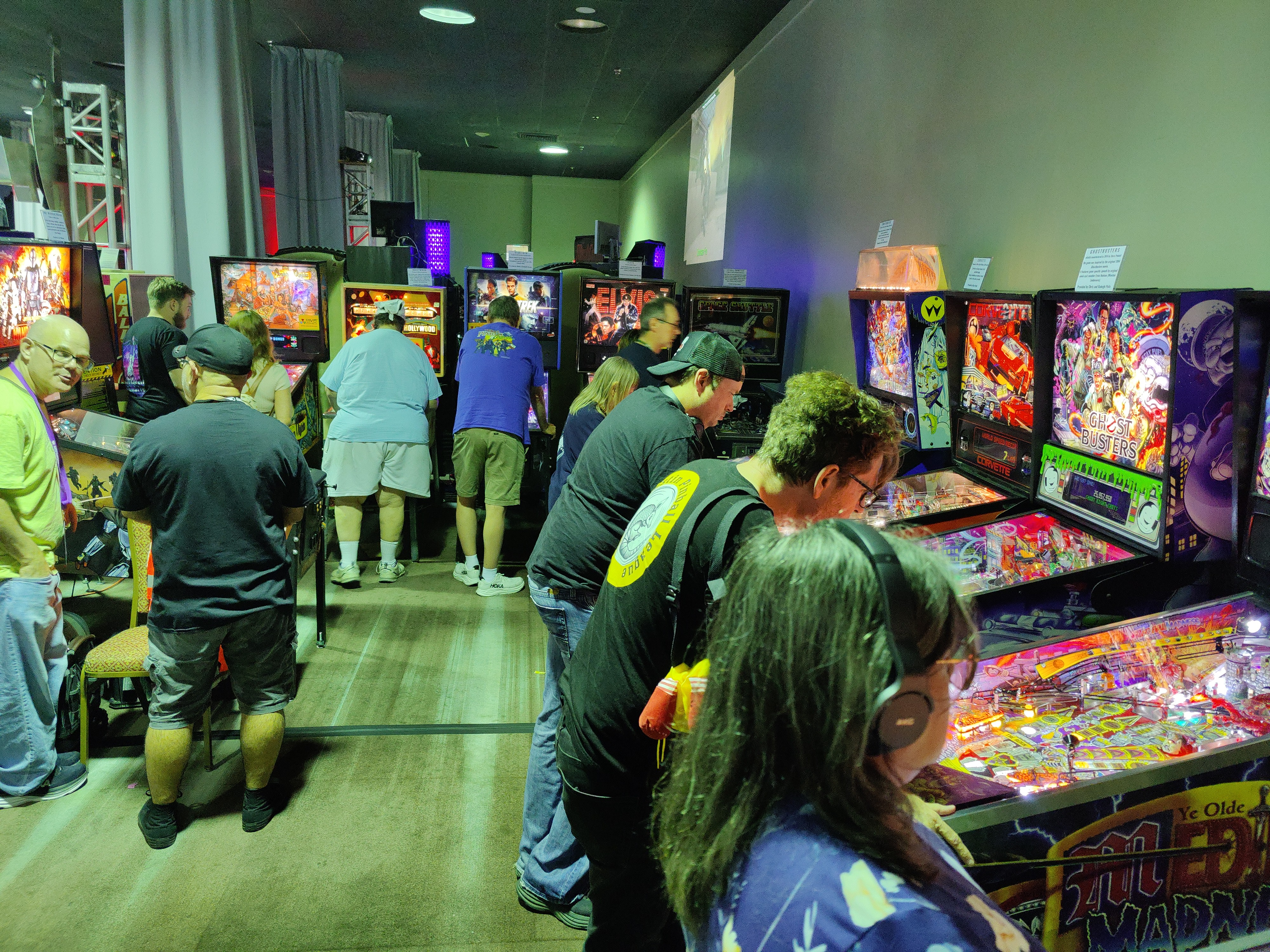
- Status: active
- Genre: Exposition
- Frequency: Yearly
- Location: Houston
- Country: USA
- Years active: 24
- Inaugurated: May 25, 2002
- Founder: Keith Christensen
- Most recent: November 14–16, 2025
- Next event: November 13–15, 2026
- Website: www.houstonarcadeexpo.com

The Houston Arcade Expo is a yearly event held in Houston which includes exclusively free-to-play arcade games, computer games, and console games from all eras of gaming. The event also has historic penny arcades. The event usually includes live-music and hosts multiple bands. While the event does host competitions it differentiates itself from other purely competitive events by appealing to those looking for of a casual gaming and party atmosphere.
